Events from the year 1788 in France.

Incumbents 
Monarch: Louis XVI

Events

7 June - Riots broke out in Grenoble, the Day of the Tiles.
21 July - Assembly of Vizille, the meeting of the Estates.
8 August - Louis XVI agreed to convene the Estates-General meeting in May 1789, for the first time since 1614.

Births

January to June
1 January - Étienne Cabet, philosopher and utopian socialist (died 1856)
6 January - Louis Marie de la Haye, Vicomte de Cormenin, jurist and political pamphleteer (died 1868)
18 February - Alexandre Soumet, poet (died 1845)
7 March - Antoine César Becquerel, scientist (died 1878)
12 March - Pierre Jean David, sculptor (died 1856)
22 March - Pierre Joseph Pelletier, chemist (died 1842)
13 April - Auguste François Chomel, pathologist (died 1858)
18 April - Charles de Steuben, painter (died 1856)
10 May - Augustin-Jean Fresnel, physicist (died 1827)

July to December
1 July - Jean-Victor Poncelet, engineer and mathematician (died 1867)
5 September - Jean-Pierre Abel-Rémusat, sinologist (died 1832)
24 December - Alexandre Guiraud, poet and novelist (died 1847)
31 December - Alphonse de Cailleux, painter and  arts administrator (died 1876)

Deaths

January to June
14 January - François Joseph Paul de Grasse, Admiral (born 1722)
25 January - Jean-Louis Alléon-Dulac, naturalist (born 1723)
4 February - Claude-Étienne Savary, orientalist, pioneer of Egyptology and translator of the Qur'an (born 1750)
17 February - Maurice Quentin de La Tour, painter (born 1704)
12 April - Carlo Antonio Campioni, composer (born 1720)
16 April - Georges-Louis Leclerc, Comte de Buffon, naturalist, mathematician, biologist, cosmologist and author (born 1707)
2 May - Antoine de Montazet, theologian and Archbishop of Lyon (born 1713)

July to December
3 July - François Jacquier, Franciscan mathematician and physicist (born 1711)
15 July - Jean Germain Drouais, painter (born 1763)
8 August - Louis François Armand du Plessis, duc de Richelieu, Marshal of France (born 1696)
19 October - Louis Antoine de Gontaut, Marshal of France (born 1700)
6 December - Nicole-Reine Lepaute, astronomer (born 1723)
8 December - Pierre André de Suffren de Saint Tropez, Admiral (born 1729)

See also

References

1780s in France